Deep dorsal vein may refer to:

 Deep dorsal veins of the penis
 Deep dorsal vein of clitoris